Rhonciscus is a genus of marine ray-finned fish, grunts belonging to the family Haemulidae. The species within the genus are found in the eastern Pacific Ocean. It is not yet recognised by Fishbase but is by the Catalog of Fishes.

Species
The following species are classified within the genus Rhonciscus:

 Rhonciscus bayanus (Jordan & Evermann, 1898) (longspine grunt)
 Rhomciscus crocro (Cuvier, 1830 (Panama grunt)

Systematics
The type species of Rhonciscus is Pristipoma crocro which Fishbase still places 'within the genus Pomadasys. Molecular studies now suggest that Pomadasys sensu lato is paraphyletic with the Rhonciscus clade being Sister to the Haemulinae branch comprising the genera Haemulopsis, Conodon and Xenichthys.
 The genus Rhonciscus Jordan & Evermann, 1896  was revived to include the species listed above, A third species, Pomadasys branickii, has also been suggested for inclusion in this genus.
The name Pristipoma is unavailable as its type species is Lutjanus hasta, a junior synonym of P. argenteus.

References

Haemulinae
Ray-finned fish genera